TKI may refer to:

 Tyrosine kinase inhibitor, a pharmaceutical drug
 McKinney National Airport (FAA LID code), McKinney, Texas, US
 Tokeen Seaplane Base (IATA code), Alaska, US
 Thomas–Kilmann Conflict Mode Instrument, a conflict style inventory
 Turkish Coal Operations Authority (TKİ, Türkiye Kömür İşletmeleri Kurumu)